Żaczek and Zaczek are  Polish surnames. "Żaczek" is a diminutive from "żak", an archaic term for "student"

Notable people with the surnames include:

Artur Zaczek (born 1989), Polish sprinter
Jarosław Żaczek (born 1967), Polish politician
 (1884-1945), Polish politician, statesman and lawyer
, Polish actress and educator

See also
Žáček, an equivalent Czech surname
Żak, Polish surname
Zak (surname)

Polish-language surnames